The following is a list of Microsoft APIs and frameworks.

APIs

Current
 Component Model
 ActiveX (while not supported in the default web browser Microsoft Edge)
 Component Object Model (COM)
 Distributed Component Object Model (DCOM)
 COM+
 Microsoft Data Access Components (MDAC), including: OLE DB
 Cryptographic API (CAPICOM)
 ActiveX Data Objects (ADO)
 Collaboration Data Objects (CDO);
 Windows Runtime (WinRT)
 Universal Windows Platform (UWP)
 DirectShow
 DirectX
 Direct2D
 Direct3D
 DirectDraw
 DirectInput
 DirectMusic
 DirectPlay
 DirectSetup
 DirectSound
 DirectWrite
 XACT (Cross-platform Audio Creation Tool)
 XAudio 2
 Media Foundation (Windows Vista / Windows 7)
 Interface
 Graphics Device Interface (GDI) and GDI+
 Application Programming Interface (API)
 Messaging Application Programming Interface (MAPI)
 Remote Application Programming Interface (RAPI)
 Speech Application Programming Interface (SAPI)
 Telephony Application Programming Interface (TAPI)
 Extensible Storage Engine (Jet Blue)
 Object linking and embedding (OLE)
 OLE Automation
 Uniscribe (see Template:Microsoft APIs section: Software Factories)
 Windows Image Acquisition (WIA)
 Windows Management Instrumentation (WMI)
 Winsock
 Win32 console
 Windows API (current versions: Win32; Win64)

Deprecated
 Active Scripting
 Collaboration Data Objects for Windows NT Server
 Dynamic Data Exchange
 Older data access technologies
 Jet Database Engine
 Data object
 Jet Data Access Objects
 Remote Data Objects (RDO)
 Remote Data Services (RDS)
 Setup API
 Windows API (old versions: Win16; Win32s)
XNA libraries for cross platform Xbox 360/Windows development

Frameworks

 .NET Framework
 Remoting, Assemblies, Metadata
 Common Language Runtime, Common Type System, Global Assembly Cache, Microsoft Intermediate Language, Windows Forms
 ADO.NET, ASP.NET
 Windows Communication Foundation (WCF)
 Windows Presentation Foundation (WPF)
 Windows Workflow Foundation (WF)
 Windows CardSpace (WCS)
 Universal Windows Platform (UWP)
 Windows PowerShell
 Microsoft Management Console (MMC)
 Text Services Framework
 Windows Driver Model
 Windows Driver Foundation

Libraries
 Microsoft Foundation Class Library (MFC)
 Active Template Library (ATL)
 Framework Class Library (FCL)
 Object Windows Library  (OWL)
 Standard Template Library (STL)
 Visual Component Library (VCL)
 Windows Template Library (WTL)
 Windows UI Library (WinUI)
 Text Object Model (TOM)

Third parties

See also
 List of Microsoft topics

Windows